This is a list of Indian Super League playoffs that have occurred. The inaugural series was in 2014.

Standard cup rules – such as the extra time and penalty shootouts – are used to decide drawn games. The higher ranked team from the regular season hosts games if there is only one leg. Winners are in bold.

2014

After the home and away season, the inaugural playoff began on 13 December and culminated on 20 December, with the first ever ISL final. The playoff was played in a single-elimination format of two-legged semifinals. Atlético de Kolkata became the inaugural champions after defeating the Kerala Blasters in the final, with Mohammed Rafique winning the Hero of the Match award.

Semi-finals

Final

2015

For the second straight year the playoff was played in a single-elimination format of two-legged semifinals. Chennaiyin became the champions after defeating the Goa in the final, with Jofre Mateu winning the Hero of the Match award.

Semi-finals

Final

2016

For the second straight year the playoffs were played in a single-elimination format of two-legged semifinals. Atlético de Kolkata became the champions after defeating the Kerala Blasters in the final, with Henrique Sereno winning the Hero of the Match award.

Semi-finals

Final

2018

From this season the league is being played across a year, therefore the fourth season playoffs were played in 2018, instead of 2017. Like the previous seasons, the matches were played in a single-elimination format of two-legged semifinals. Chennaiyin became the champions after defeating the Bengaluru in the final, with Maílson Alves winning the Hero of the Match award. Chennaiyin also earned a berth in the 2019 AFC Cup qualifying play-offs.

Semi-finals

Final

2019

For the straight fifth season, the playoffs were played in a single-elimination format of two-legged semifinals. Bengaluru became the champions after defeating the Goa in the final, with Rahul Bheke winning the Hero of the Match award. Bengaluru also earned a berth in the 2020 AFC Cup qualifying play-offs.

Semi-finals

Final

2020

For the straight sixth season, the playoffs were played in a single-elimination format of two-legged semifinals. ATK became the champions after defeating the Chennaiyin in the final, with Arindam Bhattacharya winning the Hero of the Match award. ATK also earned a berth in the 2021 AFC Cup qualifying play-offs, which was passed over to Bengaluru, as the third place team in the league table, after ATK dissolved.

Semi-finals

Final

2021

For the straight seventh season, the playoffs were played in a single-elimination format of two-legged semifinals. Mumbai City became the champions after defeating the ATK Mohun Bagan in the final, with Bipin Singh winning the Hero of the Match award. Mumbai City had already become the premiers of the regular season, earning a berth in the 2022 AFC Champions League group stage, therefore the berth in the 2022 AFC Cup qualifying play-offs was passed over to ATK Mohun Bagan, as the second place team in the league table.

Semi-finals

Final

2022

For the straight seventh season, the playoffs were played in a single-elimination format of two-legged semifinals. Hyderabad became the champions after defeating the Kerala Blasters in the final, with Laxmikant Kattimani winning the Hero of the Match award. Hyderabad earned a spot at the play-off for 2023–24 AFC Cup qualifying stage to be played against the following season's champions.

Semi-finals

Final

Appearances by club
Bold indicates they won the playoffs that year. Team names in italics indicates the club is defunct or a former Indian Super League member.

Notes and references

Notes

References

External links
 WorldFootball

Indian Super League lists